Christophe Nduwarugira (born 22 June 1994) is a Burundian professional footballer who plays as a midfielder for Portuguese club Académico de Viseu.

International career
Nduwarugira was invited by Lofty Naseem, the national team coach, to represent Burundi in the 2014 African Nations Championship held in South Africa.

International goals

References

External links
 
 

1994 births
Sportspeople from Bujumbura
Living people
Burundian footballers
Burundi A' international footballers
Burundi international footballers
Association football midfielders
LLB Académic FC players
FC Chibuto players
C.F. União players
Amora F.C. players
Varzim S.C. players
Leixões S.C. players
Académico de Viseu F.C. players
Liga Portugal 2 players
Campeonato de Portugal (league) players
2014 African Nations Championship players
2019 Africa Cup of Nations players
Burundian expatriate footballers
Expatriate footballers in Mozambique
Burundian expatriate sportspeople in Mozambique
Expatriate footballers in Portugal
Burundian expatriate sportspeople in Portugal